Krustkalni Nature Reserve is a nature reserve located in eastern Latvia that was founded in 1977. Its area is 2978 hectares. Since 2004, this institution has been part of Natura 2000, the European network of protected areas. The reserve is managed by the regional administration Latgale.

The objects of protection in the Krustkalni Nature Reserve are special landscapes  with a complex of coniferous forests and meadows, as well as underground springs that form small swamps and lakes. A feature of these sources is the high content of calcium, due to which limestone soils are formed. They grow on calciphile plant species, which often occur in the coastal areas of the country, but are not typical of eastern Latvia.

History 
The Krustkalni lands belonged to the Krustkalni forest research station prior to the creation of the reserve. 
Even before the establishment of the protected area, both Baltic German and Latvian naturalists, including , knew that this region had the richest flora of Eastern Latvia. 
Due to the difficult terrain, these areas were challenging to cultivate and impossible to apply intensive methods of forestry. At the same time, due to the height differences and the variety of landscapes, this area was characterized by rich vegetation and interesting fauna. Given these two factors, From the 1950s, researchers from both the University of Latvia and the  began to explore the area, and it became a venue for student field internships. Under the leadership of the Institute of Biology, the first nature reserve in Eastern Latvia was established there on April 15, 1977.  In total 69 land lots of the forest became a nature reserve, but temporarily remained in use by the research station. In 1979, the Slitere State Nature Reserve was established, to which all other Latvian reserves, including Krustkalni, were subordinated. In 1982, another reserve was organized in the east of Latvia - Teiči Nature Reserve. Since Teiči reserve was located in the same region as Krustkalni, a joint administration was established for these two reserves, subordinated to the Latvian Production Forestry Association "Latvias Mejs". Since February 1, 2011, the joint administration of both East Latvian reserves has been operating under the direction of the regional administration in Latgale.

Climate 
The influence of the coastal climate on its territory is weakened due to the relative separation from the coast of the Baltic Sea and the Middle Latvian uplands. The frost-free period, with temperatures above 5 °C, lasts 180 days. The average minimum temperatures are -28 °C. 600 mm precipitation falls here per year, which are distributed as follows: about 350 mm evaporates, and 250 mm create surface runoff. The strong articulation of the terrain determines the diversity microclimatic conditions in parts of the reserve.

Geography and hydrology 
Krustkalni Nature Reserve is located in the east of Latvia, on the conditional border that separates the historical regions of Vidzeme and Latgale. Its territory lies entirely within the Madona Municipality, the center of which, the city Madona, is located 15 km from the boundaries of the protected area.

During the last ice age on these lands there was a strong deposition of water-glacial material, which formed Madonsko-Trepsky shaft. Krustalny occupies its narrowest part from Lake Dreimaņa (also known as Svētes) in the north to the river Iviekste in the south. Within the reserve, the shaft consists of 2–5 ridges, up to 4 km long, with a total width of 1–2 km and 153 m above sea level. Basically, each of these ridges is 70 to 250 meters wide, has relative height of up to 50 m and a steep slope of about 35°. Between the ridges are lowlands (well drained or swampy) and wide ravines.

Along the south-eastern slope of the Madonsko-Trepsky shaft stretches the Dooku-Svetes depression, located at absolute heights of 95–100 m. It is flat and represents the bottom of an ancient lake that existed here in Holocene. A large amount of carbonates was deposited on this lake, and for some time lime was even mined industrially. Now on the site of the former quarries there are ponds that have gradually overgrown and turned into meadows.

The territory of the Krustkalni Nature Reserve is rich in reservoirs, which can be divided into three types: lakes, rivers and springs. The largest in area are the lakes, of which there are 13. Among them is Lake Dreimaņa, on the southwestern shore of which formed a one and a half kilometer peninsula. Like other lakes concentrated in the eastern part of the protected area, Dreimaņa has marshy shores and a bottom composed of limestone with layers of silt. Another river -  - has a source supply and encircles the reserve from the southwest. All these rivers are small, winding, with low banks and rich vegetation. Krustkalni springs are concentrated at the foot of the hills and on the shores of Lake Dreimaņa.

Geology and soils 
The glacial origin of landforms determines the composition of geological rocks. These are large-grained sand, rich in carbonates gravel of fluvio-glacial origin, pebbles with boulders, less often - loams and dusty material. In some places these materials are covered with boulder loams or sandstones. In Dooku-Svetes depression the carbonate rocks began to form in the boreal period, continued to accumulate in the subboreal period, and their deposition ended in the first half of the Atlantic period. The limestones of the depression are floury, fine-grained, with a carbonate content of 88-90%. Their layer reaches 5 m in thickness, on top it is covered with medium-decomposed peat, the layer of which in different parts of the depression has a thickness of 0.1 to 2.5 m. Thus, the Dooku-Svetes depression has the largest deposits of lake limestone in Latvia.

The soils of the Krustkalni Nature Reserve are diverse. In the northern part of the protected area podzol soils predominate, and in the rest of the territory -  and very small areas are occupied by gleysol and rendzina soils. Among peat soils the types inherent in fen predominate. Somewhere in the soil sections are found charcoal  - a reminder that in ancient times on these lands often raged forest fires and used slash-and-burn agriculture.

Flora 

In the biocoenosis of the reserve 604 taxa of plants of both species and subspecies level were found, including 23 species ferns, 12 species gymnosperms and 569 angiosperms. The flora of the Krustkalni Nature Reserve is dominated by members of the families Asteraceae, Poaceae, Cyperaceae, Fabaceae and Rosaceae. Orchidaceae family is also well represented with 17 species.

According to geobotanical zoning the reserve belongs to the Western sub-province of the East Baltic floristic district, but is located close to its borders with the Eastern sub-province. Species with Eurasian, European and subarctic habitats make up a significant part of the protected flora.

Forest vegetation region 
The variety of microclimatic conditions and landforms determines a wide range of plant communities and vegetation classifications. The most common phytocenoses of Krustkalni are pine and spruce forests, which alternate with small-leaved forests, small meadows, overgrown arable land and swamps of various types. The reserve belongs to the Baltic-Belarusian sub-province of the Northern European taiga province of the Eurasian taiga of Holarctic realm, so the zonal types of forests for it are complex spruce and deciduous spruce. It is these forests that occupy the highest areas of relief, while less fertile lands are overgrown with oak forest, aspen and birch and green mosses (Pleurozium schreberi, Hylocomium splendens) and Dicranum polysetum, Pteridium aquilinum, European blueberry (Vaccinium myrtillus). On the slopes of hills, on fertile soils grow spruce forests with Oxalis acetosella cover. Extremely rare are oak forest with green moss cover. In the former clearcutting areas, instead of primeval forest, new forest has been formed from Alnus incana (grey alder), where in the undergrowth there are many Small leaved lime (Tilia cordata), Prunus padus (hackberry), Sorbus aucuparia (rowan), Ribes nigrum (blackcurrant). The grass cover of alders is dominated by Urtica dioica (common nettle), which forms high and dense thickets. Instead, pine forests seem light because they grow on dry sandy soils, which are not to the liking of most forest grasses. For this reason, the lower tier of vegetation here is formed by cranberry bushes with admixtures of Melampyrum pratense and rare Chimaphila umbellata. On the tops of the hills, this cover changes to a thicket of blueberries or a mixture of cladonia lichens (Cetraria islandica) from Ericaceae.

Forests on carbonate soils have a special floristic composition. They can be of different types (spruce, aspen, birch, very rarely pine or from goat willow), but always contain minor impurities of deciduous species: Small leaved lime (Tilia cordata), European oak (Quercus robur), Norway maple (Acer platanoides), European white elm (Ulmus laevis) and wych elm (Ulmus glabra). Undergrowth in such forests is very dense and diverse including European fly honeysuckle (Lonicera xylosteum), common hazel (Corylus avellana), guelder rose (Viburnum opulus) and Daphne mezereum. The grass cover of such forests is very similar to the cover of southern oak forests. In particular, it contains a lot of ground elder (Aegopodium podagraria), may lily (Maianthemum bifolium), Anemone hepatica, Dog's mercury (Mercurialis perennis), Asarum europaeum, and sweetscented bedstraw (Galium odoratum).

In the lowest parts of the terrain grow a variety of swampy forests. For example, if it is birch, then the ground cover is formed by sphagnums (mostly Sphagnum magellanicum), Marsh Labrador Tea (Rhododendron tomentosum) and bilberry (Vaccinium myrtillus); if the forest is made of downy birch (Betula pubescens), then common reed (Phragmites australis), buckbean (Menyanthes), purple moor grass (Molinia caerulea), fibrous tussock-sedge (Carex appropinquata) and Carex cespitosa, and sedges with their turf form a characteristic bumpy microrelief; if the forest is spruce, then its grass cover is dominated by ferns and sedges; if the forest is formed common alder (Alnus glutinosa), it is rich in such herbs as may lily (Maianthemum bifolium), stinging nettle (Urtica dioica), chickweed wintergreen (Lysimachia europaea), goutweed (Aegopodium podagraria), cabbage thistle (Cirsium oleraceum), meadow sweet (Filipendula ulmaria). Shrubs are sometimes found in the forests of the reserve, which are not very common in Latvia. Thus, in dry forests you can come across single individuals juniper, on more fertile soils - European spindle (Euonymus europaeus) and (Euonymus verrucosus).

Maedows vegetation region 
The meadows of the Krustkalni Nature Reserve are divided into three types: dry, mesophytic (moderately moist) and lowland. Dry meadows are confined to the slopes of the hills, on their dry and barren lands grow unpretentious common quaking grass (Briza media), common bent (Agrostis capillaris) and sweet vernal grass (Anthoxanthum odoratum). The grassland of mesophytic meadows is dominated by (Dactylis glomerata), and in the lowlands, in addition to gramineae, for example Deschampsia cespitosa, there are representatives of other families - Geum rivale, Filipendula ulmaria, Carex panicea and Carex vesicaria. Two peculiar bows of Krustkalni deserve special attention. The first is located at the foot of the hill, where a cold spring precipitates lime on the surrounding surface. In this meadow, tall curtains of greater tussock sedge (Carex paniculata) border on rare Dactylorhiza russowii and Ligularia sibirica, and in the Krustkalni reserve is the largest population of the latter species in Latvia. Another meadow occupies the territory of the peninsula on Lake Dreimaņa. In this place, marshy lime protrudes directly from the bowels of the earth directly to the surface, which is why there are many calcephilic species. Among the inconspicuous sedge grass (Carex) of the peninsula you can find beautiful members of orchid family — Epipactis palustris, Dactylorhiza baltica and Dactylorhiza incarnata, as well as rare curtains saw sedge (Cladium mariscus) (through the reserve runs the northeastern boundary of the range of this species). Near the springs on this meadow settled green mosses and Fen orchid (Liparis loeselii), and on the shore a lot of reeds (Phragmites).

Bogs vegetation region 
Krustkalni bogs are confined to either the depressions between the hills or to the shores of lakes. Among them, lowland and fen predominate, raised bogs are less common. The vegetation of lowland swamps consists of variety of Carex species, such as panic grass (Panicum), black sedge (Carex nigra), yellow sedge (Carex flava), blister sedge (Carex vesicaria), bottle sedge (Carex rostrata), woollyfruit sedge (Carex lasiocarpa) with significant impurities broad leaved cotton grass (Eriophorum latifolium) and individual species of the buckbean (Menyanthes) and marsh cinquefoil (Comarum palustre). In transitional bogs, blueberries (Cyanococcus), cranberries (Vaccinium oxycoccos), and Labrador tea (Rhododendron tomentosum) join these plants. By contrast the raised bogs are very different from these two types. These biotopes are the kingdom of peat moss (Sphagnum), especially Sphagnum magellanicum. Of the herbaceous plants, they are dominated by Hare's-tail cottongrass (Eriophorum vaginatum) and insectivorous plants — English sundew (Drosera anglica) and round-leaved sundew (Drosera rotundifolia). In some places in the swamps of the reserve there are thickets formed by different species of willow, black alder and rare shrub birch (Betula humilis).

Coastal vegetation region 
The flora of the Krustkalni Nature Reserve includes coastal amphibians (helophytes), plants that grow submerged in water, and species that float freely on its surface. Among the coastal plants common are marsh cinquefoil (Comarum palustre), slender tufted-sedge (Carex acuta), Calla palustris (Calla), buckbean (Menyanthes), marsh fern (Thelypteris palustris), and on some lakes also common reed (Phragmites australis), saw grass (Cladium), broadleaf cattail (Typha latifolia) and narrowleaf cattail (Typha angustifolia). The deeper parts of the reservoirs are inhabited by European white water lily (Nymphaea alba) and Nymphaea candida, yellow water-lily (Nuphar lutea), and on their surface often float common duckweed (Lemna minor), Lemna trisulca, as well as Canadian pond weed (Elodea canadensis). Sometimes at the bottom of the reservoirs you can see a kind of underwater "meadows" formed by algae of the genus Chara.

Protected vegetation 
In the Krustkalni Reserve, scientists have described 32 species of plants listed in the Red Book of Latvia. Of these, of particular value are the swamp sawgrass (Cladium mariscus) and Small pasque flower (Pulsatilla pratensis) (found in only two places). Species such as Gladiolus imbricatus, Ligularia sibirica, blue cowslip (Pulmonaria angustifolia), yellow foxglove (Digitalis grandiflora) do not occur at all in other reserves of Latvia. Of scientific interest are Eastern pasqueflower (Pulsatilla patens), Siberian iris (Iris sibirica) and snowdrop windflower (Anemonoides sylvestris), whose cells are located on the western border of their habitats. Not so rare, but also subject to protection are European crab apple (Malus sylvestris), European columbine (Aquilegia vulgaris), common bearberry (Arctostaphylos uva-ursi), yellow coralroot (Corallorhiza trifida), and Schoenus ferrugineus. Orchids are worth a special mention. Most of them prefer moist meadows with calcareous soil. In relatively small areas, you can find Dactylorhiza russowii, Dactylorhiza baltica, Dactylorhiza incarnata, Dactylorhiza fuchsii, Dactylorhiza maculata, Platanthera chlorantha and Platanthera bifolia, Liparis loeselii, Orchis mascula, Malaxis monophyllos. Only dark-red helleborine (Epipactis atrorubens) prefers the dry sunny roadsides and forest edges. Among the more primitive plants under protection are various specimens of clubmoss (Lycopodiopsida) — stiff clubmoss (Spinulum annotinum), common clubmoss (Lycopodium clavatum), fir clubmoss (Huperzia selago) and groundcedar (Diphasiastrum complanatum).

The species composition of lichens and fungi in the Krustkalni Nature Reserve has not been sufficiently studied.

Fauna 
Forty-one species of mammals (70% of the mammals of the country), 140 species of birds (45% of the avifauna of Latvia), 5 species of reptiles, 6 species of amphibians, 21 species of fish and about 400 species of insects. Of these, 37 species are listed in the Red Book of Latvia. The species of boreal mixed forests are mostly represented in the local fauna, and the reserve is also characterized by deciduous forests. Much less purely taiga and forest-steppe species.

Mammals 
All species of insectivorous mammals in the reserve are common, such as European hedgehog (Erinaceus europaeus), common shrew (Sorex araneus), Eurasian pygmy shrew (Sorex minutus), and European mole (Talpa europaea). Among the representatives of this series were observed brown long-eared bat  (Plecotus auritus), northern bat (Eptesicus nilssonii), pond bat (Myotis dasycneme), and common noctule (Nyctalus noctula).

The mountain hare (Lepus timidus) is common in the reserve, and European hare (Lepus europaeus) are rare, however, populations of both species tend to decrease. Very numerous small rodents. For example, in forests there are many bank vole (Myodes glareolus), wetlands are dominated by short-tailed vole (Microtus agrestis), in open spaces  - common vole (Microtus arvalis), yellow-necked mouse (Apodemus flavicollis), and striped field mouse (Apodemus agrarius). The Eurasian beaver (Castor fiber) also prospers in Krustkalni and successfully breeds there.

Krustkalni forests are also a refuge for various predators. In particular, there are numerous species of least weasel (Mustela nivalis), European polecat (Mustela putorius), and stoat (Mustela erminea). There are stable populations Eurasian otter (Lutra lutra), red fox (Vulpes vulpes) and European pine marten (Martes martes). European badgers (Meles meles) and raccoon dogs (Nyctereutes procyonoides) are quite numerous, they displace badgers from their lairs. Similarly, under the influence of American mink (Neovison vison), the population European mink (Mustela lutreola) is slowly declining. Territory of the reserve are regularly visited by one or two Eurasian lynxes (Lynx lynx).

Of the four species of ungulates in the forests of the reserve, the most common are moose (Alces alces) and wild boar (Sus scrofa), but the population European roe deer (Capreolus capreolus) is also large. Its condition largely depends on wintering conditions. In addition, the red deer (Cervus elaphus) numbers are also gradually increasing in Krustkalni.

Birds 
Of the 140 species of birds found in the Krustkalni Nature Reserve, 107 species have been nesting. Given the prevalence of forest biocenoses, the dominant species in this area are small sparrows. Most often you can come across European robin (Erithacus rubecula), common chiffchaff (Phylloscopus collybita), wood warbler (Phylloscopus sibilatrix) and willow warbler (Phylloscopus trochilus), and in some areas dominated by willow tit (Poecile montanus), great tit (Parus major), European pied flycatcher (Ficedula hypoleuca). However, many species of birds are confined to certain habitats. For example, only in coniferous forests it is possible to observe spotted nutcracker (Nucifraga caryocatactes), crested tit (Lophophanes cristatus), red-breasted flycatcher (Ficedula parva), goldcrest (Regulus regulus), dunnock (Prunella modularis), song thrush (Turdus philomelos) and redwing (Turdus iliacus), yellowhammer (Emberiza citrinella), etc. It nests exclusively on the edges and clearings European nightjar (Caprimulgus europaeus). The owners of deciduous forests are garden warbler (Sylvia borin), spotted flycatcher (Muscicapa striata), common linnet (Linaria cannabina).

The avifauna of open biocenoses is more reminiscent of the steppes and meadows of the south. Among the grasses arrange their nests Eurasian skylark (Alauda arvensis), whinchat (Saxicola rubetra), meadow pipit (Anthus pratensis), northern wheatear (Oenanthe oenanthe), northern lapwing (Vanellus vanellus), western yellow wagtail (Motacilla flava)  and white wagtail (Motacilla alba). To some extent, this group also includes synanthropic species, which tend to human habitation. In particular, near the buildings in the reserve were seen house sparrow (Passer domesticus)  and Eurasian tree sparrow (Passer montanus), barn swallow (Hirundo rustica)  and common house martin (Delichon urbicum), Eurasian collared dove (Streptopelia decaocto).

In autumn, only 50 species of birds remain in the Krustkalni Nature Reserve for the winter. These are not only sparrows (great and long-tailed tits, field and house sparrows, European greenfinch (Chloris chloris), Eurasian siskin (Spinus spinus), brown-headed nuthatch, willow tit (Poecile montanus)), but also representatives of other series, in particular, northern goshawk (Accipiter gentilis), black woodpecker (Dryocopus martius), lesser spotted woodpecker (Dryobates minor) and great spotted woodpecker (Dendrocopos major). At this time, crows become very noticeable: western jackdaw (Coloeus monedula), Eurasian magpie (Pica pica), common raven (Corvus corax), hooded crow (Corvus cornix).

Birds of prey in the reserve, although not represented by too many species, but have stable populations. Of the diurnal predators, the most common are common buzzard (Buteo buteo) and the northern goshawk (Accipiter gentilis), slightly smaller Eurasian sparrowhawk (Accipiter nisus). From the surrounding areas to hunt for the reserve is often visited Eurasian hobby (Falco subbuteo). Of the nocturnal predators in the Krustkalni forests, tawny owl (Strix aluco) and long-eared owl (Asio otus) regularly nest. In addition to them, Eurasian pygmy owl (Glaucidium passerinum), boreal owl (Aegolius funereus)  and Ural owl (Strix uralensis) were observed here.

Chicken birds are represented by such species as black grouse (Lyrurus tetrix), hazel grouse (Tetrastes bonasia) and grey partridge (Perdix perdix). But if the first two species in the reserve feel good, nest annually and even to some extent dominate in winter, the gray partridge suffers from the use of fertilizers and pesticides in the surrounding fields. Another species that is vulnerable for the same reason is corn crake (Crex crex). Waterfowl and waterfowl, tied to water bodies that are virtually unvisited by outsiders, do not experience anthropogenic pressure. On the lakes of the reserve there are numerous Eurasian coot (Fulica atra), mallard (Anas platyrhynchos), common moorhen (Gallinula chloropus), great crested grebe (Podiceps cristatus), garganey (Spatula querquedula)  and Eurasian teal (Anas crecca) . The grey heron (Ardea cinerea) and black stork (Ciconia nigra) regularly come here for feeding, although the latter species is quite rare. During migrations in the reserve, large flocks of common crane (Grus grus) (single individuals remain for nesting), taiga bean goose (Anser fabalis)  and greylag goose (Anser anser) stop for rest.

Reptiles 
Of the five species of reptiles, Krustkalni has the largest population of viviparous lizard (Zootoca vivipara), as well as many common European vipers (Vipera berus). The sand lizards (Lacerta agilis) prefer dry edges of pine forests, while the grass snakes (Natrix natrix), on the contrary, tend to like water bodies. Only slowworm (Anguis fragilis) is a rare reptile.

Amphibians 
The most numerous species of amphibians in the reserve are considered to be moor frog (Rana arvalis), but not much inferior to the population density pool frogs (Pelophylax lessonae), common frog (Rana temporaria) and marsh frog (Pelophylax ridibundus), as well as common toads (Bufo bufo). In the spring in the rivers you can see smooth newt (Lissotriton vulgaris), which at other times of the year are inconspicuous.

Fish 
The most numerous species of fish in protected lakes are predators - European perch (Perca fluviatilis) and northern pike (Esox lucius). Naturally, there is also a lot of their prey, such as tench (Tinca tinca), common roach (Rutilus rutilus) and white bream (Blicca bjoerkna). The ponds formed on the site of the former quarries are dominated by carp: crucian carp (Carassius carassius), common bleak (Alburnus alburnus), European chub (Squalius cephalus), sunbleak (Leucaspius delineatus). Instead, Eurasian minnows (Phoxinus) and gudgeon (Gobio gobio) like to settle in rapid springs. Experimental catches made in small rivers also found stone loach (Barbatula barbatula), burbot (Lota lota) and weatherfish (Misgurnus fossilis).

Insects 
About 400 species of insects and 12 species of spiders have been found in the Krustkalni Nature Reserve. There are a lot of tiny Protura and springtails (Collembola) in the forest litter. The most numerous species of dragonflies is Aeshna grandis, the lakes are also common beautiful demoiselle (Calopteryx virgo), and Calopteryx splendens flies over steep rivers. Just a few Orthoptera species have been found: Gryllotalpa gryllotalpa distributed on the edges, and Tettigoniidae (Chorthippus) inhabit meadows and bushes. In contrast, Krustkalni has a very large variety of beetles. There are only 15 species of turuns here, of which the most common are Carabus granulatus, Carabus nemoralis, Carabus arcensis. In different types of forests live beetles, which feed on corpses. These are members of the genus Nicrophorus (Silphidae). Relatively many in forests longhorn beetles (Cerambycidae) and leaf beetles (Chrysomelidae). It is not difficult to find whirligig beetles (Gyrinidae) and great diving beetles (Dytiscus marginalis) in reservoirs. In addition, in the reservoirs are numerous representatives of other groups of insects, such as predatory backswimmers (Notonecta), water striders (Gerridae), caddisfly, whose larvae play an important role in the diet of some fish, mayfly, whose mass flight is observed on Lake Dreimaņa every year in late spring.

In addition to beetle, the second largest group of insects is Lepidoptera. 48 species of butterflies from 12 families have been described in the Krustkalni Reserve, of which 28 are day and 20 are nocturnal. Among the diurnal species common are European peacock (Aglais io), mourning cloak (Nymphalis antiopa), several species Pieridae, a typical moth can be considered  Ematurga atomaria. Of the two-winged very common Tachinidae, hoverfly, Cecidomyiidae, crane fly (Tipulidae), horse-fly. Hymenoptera are very useful for the ecosystems of the reserve, of which wasps, bumblebees and wild bees act as pollinators of plants, and ants (first of all Formica polyctena and Formica rufa) and parasitoid wasps regulate the number of tree parasites.

Scientists of the reserve pay special attention to the protection of rare species: turuna  Carabus violaceus  (found only once), butterfly Lycaena dispar, whose flight was observed only near the village of Liaudona, scarlet tiger moth (Callimorpha dominula) can be found on the north-western border of the range and Old World swallowtail (Papilio machaon) can be found the northern border of the range.

Invertebrates 
Of the other invertebrates in the reserve, only the population was studied Astacus astacus (European crayfish).

Scientific and economic activity 
Krustkalni attracted the attention of scientists in the 19th century. In 1895, the botanist A. Rapp compiled a list of local flora, which already included 417 species of plants found on the outskirts of Liaudona. Since the 1940s, floristic research in Krustkalni has been conducted regularly by students University of Latvia. In 1972, a thorough study of local mosses was carried out by bryologist A. Abolin, and in 1976 the baton was taken over by the famous florist A. Rasinsh. Based on the results of these studies, it was decided to grant this area the status of a reserve in order to preserve unique habitats and their inherent diversity of plants. After the creation of the reserve, research on its territory is conducted by employees of the Teiči Reserves and, to some extent, Slītere National Park.

There is a strict protection regime on the territory of the Krustkalni Nature Reserve, which prohibits any economic activity: felling of trees, mining, hunting, harvesting of vegetable raw materials, introduced species, etc. Two public roads pass directly through the reserve, and its borders are adjacent to agricultural lands. Visiting the reserve by outsiders, even as part of excursion groups, is prohibited, with special permission only scientists can do it.

References

External links

Strict nature reserves in Latvia
Protected areas established in 1977
Natura 2000 in Latvia
1977 establishments in the Soviet Union
Madona Municipality